"Danger" is a song recorded by American singer Erykah Badu for her third studio album Worldwide Underground (2003). It was written and produced by Badu, James Poyser, Rashad Smith and R.C. Williams. The song samples and is a sequel to Badu's single "Otherside of the Game" (1997), being set further along in the couple's relationship, after the protagonist's boyfriend has been arrested. It was released as the lead single from Worldwide Underground on August 4, 2003, by Motown Records.

A minor commercial success, "Danger" peaked at number 82 on the US Billboard Hot 100 and number 27 on the Hot R&B/Hip-Hop Songs. Since its release, the song has been performed live on almost all of Badu's concert tours.

Track listings and formats

US 12-inch vinyl
 "Danger" (album version) – 6:29
 "Danger" (radio edit) – 4:24
 "Danger" (radio edit instrumental) – 4:24

European CD single
 "Danger" (radio edit) – 4:24
 "Danger" (Edroc Remix) – 4:26

European maxi CD single
 "Danger" (radio edit) – 4:24
 "Danger" (album version) – 6:29
 "Danger" (Edroc Remix) – 4:26
 "Danger" (Afreex Remix) (featuring Thundastorm) – 4:47

Charts

Release history

References

2003 singles
Erykah Badu songs
Songs written by James Poyser
Songs written by Erykah Badu
Songs written by Rashad Smith
Sequel songs
2002 songs
Hip hop soul songs